Kim Khazei is a female news anchor  for 7News Boston WHDH-TV and its sister station WLVI-TV (CW56).

Career 
Kim Khazei began her TV career at KOMU-TV in Columbia, Missouri, then worked for four years at KQTV in Missouri as an evening anchor and reporter.

She became an evening news anchor for the NBC affiliates in Champaign, Illinois and later went to work at KOVR-TV in Sacramento, California as an anchor and reporter.

Khazei came to Channel 7 in Boston, Massachusetts in January 1994 at the time when Sunbeam Television Corporation took over the station and introduced a "fast-paced, graphics-driven, and aggressive brand of local news" to the Boston market. She worked for the station's morning show and co-anchored the debut of WHDH's first 4 p.m. news.

After being on personal leave since July 2001, she resigned in September 2001 to dedicate her full-time to raise her children and be with her husband and family. In August 2007, she returned to her duties at WHDH-TV.

Personal life 
Khazei is married to Scott A. Huff, a Bowling Green State University alumnus and a division manager for a medical technology company, and they have three children, Hayden (born 1994), Walker, and Tatum. They live in Winchester, Massachusetts.

She is also the cousin of Massachusetts social entrepreneur and politician, Alan Khazei.

References

American television news anchors
American people of Iranian descent
Living people
1959 births
Television anchors from Sacramento, California